Samsung Capital Co, Ltd. is a Korean financial company, established in 1999 with headquarters in Seoul, South Korea. It was the financial services unit of Samsung. Its divisions are responsible for over 50% of Samsung Electronics revenue.

See also
Economy of South Korea
Samsung Electronics
Samsung

External links
Samsung Capital Homepage

Former Samsung subsidiaries
Financial services companies of South Korea
Financial services companies established in 1999
South Korean companies established in 1999